Olga da Polga is a fictional guinea pig, who is the heroine of a series of books for children written by Michael Bond and published between 1971 and 2002. Unlike Bond's more famous character, Paddington Bear, Olga is a teller of tall tales in the style of Baron Munchausen. The typical plot of each story is that something fairly ordinary happens to Olga, and she gives her animal friends a wildly exaggerated version of events, subsequently revealed to be untrue by what the humans say.

Bond's books were memorably illustrated by Danish artist Hans Helweg, who was also well known for his "pulp fiction" covers for Pan paperbacks.  His illustrations are still strongly associated with Olga, although later editions have used different imagery including artwork by Catherine Rayner for Usborne.

Olga was named after the Bond family's real guinea pig: in 2014, Guardian journalist Michelle Pauli met Olga number six.

In 2022, the BBC commissioned 13 episodes of a live-action TV series of Olga da Polga for CBeebies, featuring Julie Wilson Nimmo and Greg Hemphill.

Television series 
In 2022, the BBC commissioned 13 episodes of a live-action TV series of Olga da Polga for CBeebies, featuring Julie Wilson Nimmo and Greg Hemphill.

Books

Chapter books
1971  The Tales of Olga da Polga
1973  Olga Meets Her Match
1976  Olga Carries On
1982  Olga Takes Charge
1987  The Complete Adventures of Olga Da Polga (omnibus)
1993  The Adventures of Olga Da Polga (omnibus)
2001  Olga Moves House
2002  Olga Follows Her Nose
2002  The Best of Olga Da Polga (omnibus)

Picture books
1975  Olga Counts Her Blessings
1975  Olga Makes a Friend
1975  Olga Makes a Wish
1975  Olga Makes Her Mark
1975  Olga Takes a Bite
1975  Olga's New Home
1975  Olga's Second House
1975  Olga's Special Day
1983  The First Big Olga da Polga Book (omnibus)
1983  The Second Big Olga da Polga Book (omnibus)

Characters
 Olga – the protagonist of the stories.
 Karen Sawdust – Olga's owner and caretaker. As a child, she seems to understand Olga better than her parents.
 Mrs. Sawdust – Karen's mother.
 Mr. Sawdust – Karen's father. Built Olga's home.
 Noel – Karen's pet black cat. He is sly and knowledgeable in the ways of the world, as he is free to enter and leave the house as he pleases. Although he claims to not believe most of Olga's tales, he still listens to them often.
 Graham – a tortoise. Dislikes being picked up and set down upside down. He's very slow, but often has a unique way of viewing the world.
 Fangio – a hedgehog with Argentine blood. He often stays in a box in the Sawdust's garage, and enjoys a meal of bread soaked in milk. He often goes to the Elysian Fields (a patch of waste land beyond the shrubbery).
 Boris – Olga's boyfriend. He lives by the seaside, and is also the father of Olga's children. He watches too much TV, but this makes him a very good storyteller. He rivals Olga in the storytelling department.
 Fircone and Raisin – two hamsters that Karen buys later. Although Olga is initially jealous of them, as they are kept in Karen's room and seem to be her favourites, she quickly warms up to them. They bite Noel when he tries to sneak up on them, which earns Olga's respect, as she admires them for standing up to Noel, small as they are.
 Venables – a toad who lives in a pond in the Sawdust family's garden.

See also
 Peter Gurney, a Guinea pig specialist who cared for Michael Bond’s own Guinea pig.

References

Characters in children's literature
Literary characters introduced in 1971
Fictional cavies
Animal tales